Power Move may refer to:

The procedure by which a railroad, airline, trucking, or other transportation company relocates powered fleet vehicles such as locomotives, airliners, and/or tractor units by sending them on scheduled trips which would otherwise be unnecessary. This might include low-demand short-haul trips between a smaller site and busier one in order to pick up freight or passengers at the busier site, or trips intended for redistribution of “power” (vehicles) from sites which have high inbound traffic volumes but low outbound traffic volumes to those with the inverse traffic characteristics.
Power move, in breakdancing
Power Move (album), a 2009 album by Screaming Females
Power Move Pro Wrestling, a 1995 video game
Power Moves, a 1992 video game
Power Moves: The Table, a 1998 album by SPM